Smell the Magic is the second studio album by American rock band L7, released in 1990 by Sub Pop. Originally issued as a 12" EP containing only the first six songs, it was reissued on CD in July 1991, expanded to album length with three more tracks: "Packin' a Rod," "Just Like Me," and "American Society." The opening track "Shove" was released as the band's first single.

Critical reception
The Encyclopedia of Popular Music called the album "a raucous, grunge-flavored blast." Trouser Press wrote that "L7 still brings the noise, but with a melodicism that isn’t as evident on the first album."

Track listing

Personnel
L7
Donita Sparks -  guitar, vocals, lead vocals on tracks 2,4,5,7,9
Suzi Gardner -   guitar, lead vocals on tracks 1,5,6,9
Jennifer Finch - bass guitar, lead vocals on tracks 3,8,9
Demetra Plakas - drums

Guest
Mike Patton - guest vocals

Production
Jack Endino - producer
Michael James - engineer
Daniel Rey - engineer
Randall Martin - logo
Charles Peterson - photography
Howard Rosenberg - photography
Jeff Price - art director

References

L7 (band) albums
1990 albums
Sub Pop albums